Duvall (also DuVall) is a French surname and an alternative spelling of "Duval", which literally translates from French to English as "of the valley".  It derives from the Norman "Devall", which has both English and French ties. Variant spellings include: Davolls, Deavall, DeVile, Devill, Deville, Divall, Divell and Evill. Its meaning is derived from the French town of Déville, Seine-Inferieure. The spelling, "Devall", was first recorded in England in the Domesday Book.

In France, variant spellings include: Lavalle, Lavallie, Laval, Lavall, Deval, Lavell, Lavelle and Lavielle.  The Duvall surname has also been spelled some other ways including DeVall, Devoll, DeVol, DeValle and Devaulle.

Notable people with the surname include:

 Adam Duvall, American baseball player
 Betty Duvall, a spy for the American Confederacy
 Carol Duvall, television show host
 Clea DuVall, American actress
 Gabriel Duvall, American jurist in the 18th and 19th centuries
 Len Duvall, British politician
 Marcus Duvall, character in a 2005 American-French action thriller film
 Mareen Duvall, a French Huguenot and an early American settler
 Marty Duvall, father of Carly Duvall
 Michael D. Duvall, American politician
 Mike Duvall, American baseball player
 Robert Duvall, American actor
 Robert E. Duvall, American politician
 Shelley Duvall, American actress
 Thomas L. Duvall Jr., scientist – Mount Duvall was named after him
 Wayne Duvall, American actor
 William DuVall, American musician
 Davon Duvall, Modern Day Icon

See also 
 Deval (disambiguation)
 Devall (surname)
 Duval (surname)
 Duvall (disambiguation)

References 

French-language surnames